Adolf Scheffknecht (4 October 1914 – 11 September 1941) was an Austrian gymnast. He competed in eight events at the 1936 Summer Olympics. He was killed in action during World War II.

References

1914 births
1941 deaths
Austrian male artistic gymnasts
Olympic gymnasts of Austria
Gymnasts at the 1936 Summer Olympics
People from Bregenz
Sportspeople from Vorarlberg
Austrian military personnel killed in World War II
20th-century Austrian people